Vande Mataram (also spelt Bande Mataram;) is a poem written in sanskritised Bengali by Bankim Chandra Chatterjee in the 1870s. The first two verses of the poem were adopted as the National Song of India in October 1937 by the Congress.

The poem was first published in 1882 as part of Chatterjee's Bengali novel Anandmath. It is an ode to the motherland, personified as the "mother goddess" is later verses, of the people. This initially referred to Bengal, with the "mother" figure therefore being Banga Mata (Mother Bengal), though the text does not mention this explicitly. Indian nationalist and philosopher Sri Aurobindo referred Vande Mataram as the "national Anthem of Bengal". 

Nonetheless, the poem played a vital role in the Indian independence movement. It first gained political significance when it was recited by Rabindranath Tagore at Congress in 1896. By 1905, it had become a popular amongst political activists and freedom fighters as a marching song. The song, as well as Anandmath, were banned under British colonial rule under threat of imprisonment, making its use revolutionary. The ban was ultimately overturned by the Indian government upon independence in 1947.

On 24 January 1950, the Constituent Assembly of India adopted Vande Mataram as the Republic's national song. President of India Rajendra Prasad stated that the song should be honoured equally with the national anthem of India, Jana Gana Mana. While the Constitution of India does not make reference to a "national song", the Government filed an affidavit at the Delhi High Court in November 2022 stating that Jana Gana Mana and Vande Mataram would “stand on the same level”, and that citizens should show equal respect to both.

The first two verses of the song make abstract reference to the "mother" and "motherland", without any religious connotation. However, later verses mention Hindu goddesses such as Durga.

Unlike the national anthem, there are no rules or decorum to be observed when reciting Vande Mataram.

Etymology
The root of the Sanskrit word Vande is Vand, which appears in Rigveda and other Vedic texts. According to Monier Monier-Williams, depending on the context, vand means "to praise, celebrate, laud, extol, to show honour, do homage, salute respectfully", or "deferentially, venerate, worship, adore", or "to offer anything respectfully to". The word Mātaram has Indo-European roots in mātár- (Sanskrit), méter (Greek), mâter (Latin) which mean "mother".

Lyrics of the song
The first two verses of Vande Mataram adopted as the "National Song" read as follows:

Lyric

Translation

The first translation of Bankim Chandra Chattopadhyay's novel Anandamath, including the poem Vande Mataram, into English was by Nares Chandra Sen-Gupta, with the fifth edition published in 1906 titled "The Abbey of Bliss".

Here is the translation in prose of the above two stanzas rendered by Sri Aurobindo Ghosh. This has also been adopted by the Government of India's national portal. The original Vande Mataram consists of six stanzas and the translation in prose for the complete poem by Shri Aurobindo appeared in Karmayogin, 20 November 1909.

Mother, I bow to thee!
Rich with thy hurrying streams,
Bright with thy orchard gleams,
Cool with the winds of delight,
Dark fields waving, Mother of might,
Mother free.

Glory of moonlight dreams,
Over thy branches and lordly streams,
Clad in thy blossoming trees,
Mother, giver of ease,
Laughing low and sweet,
Mother, I kiss thy feet,
Speaker sweet and low,
Mother, to thee I bow. [Verse 1]

Who hath said thou art weak in thy lands,
When the swords flash out in seventy million hands,
And seventy million voices roar
Thy dreadful name from shore to shore?
With many strengths who art mighty and strong,
To thee I call, Mother and Lord!
Thou who savest, arise and save!
To her I cry who ever her foemen drove
Back from plain and Sea
And shook herself free. [Verse 2]

Thou art wisdom, thou art law,
Thou art heart, our soul, our breath
Thou art love divine, the awe
In our hearts that conquers death.
Thine the strength that nerves the arm,
Thine the beauty, thine the charm.
Every image divine.
In our temples is but thine. [Verse 3]

Thou art Goddess Durga, Lady and Queen,
With her hands that strike and her swords of sheen,
Thou art Goddess Kamala (Lakshmi), lotus-throned,
And Goddess Vani (Saraswati), bestower of wisdom known
Pure and perfect without peer,
Mother lend thine ear,
Rich with thy hurrying streams,
Bright with thy orchard gleams,
Dark of hue O candid-fair [Verse 4]

In thy soul, with jewelled hair
And thy glorious smile divine,
Loveliest of all earthly lands,
Showering wealth from well-stored hands!
Mother, mother mine!
Mother sweet, I bow to thee,
Mother great and free! [Verse 5]

Apart from the above prose translation, Sri Aurobindo also translated Vande Mataram into a verse form known as Mother, I praise thee!. Sri Aurobindo commented on his English translation of the poem that "It is difficult to translate the National Song of India into verse in another language owing to its unique union of sweetness, simple directness and high poetic force."

Translation into other languages
Vande Mataram has inspired many Indian poets and has been translated into numerous Indian languages, such as Tamil, Telugu, Kannada, Odia, Malayalam, Assamese, Hindi, Marathi, Gujarati, Punjabi Urdu and others.

Arif Mohammad Khan translated Vande Mataram in Urdu. It can be read in Urdu (Devanagari script) as:

History and significance

Composition
Bankim Chandra Chatterjee was one of the earliest graduates of the newly established Calcutta University. After his BA, he joined the colonial government as a civil servant, becoming a Deputy Collector and later a Deputy Magistrate. Chattopadhyay was very intereste in recent events in Indian and Bengali history, particularly the Revolt of 1857 and the previous century's Sanyasi Rebellion. Around the same time, the administration was trying to promote "God Save the Queen" as the anthem for Indian subjects, which Indian nationalists disliked. It is generally believed that the concept of Vande Mataram came to Bankim Chandra Chattopadhyay when he was still a government official, around 1876. He wrote Vande Mataram at Chinsura (Chuchura), there is a white colour house of Adhya Family near river Hooghly (near Mallik Ghat).

Chattopadhyay wrote the poem in a spontaneous session using words from Sanskrit and Bengali. The poem was published in Chattopadhyay's book Anandamath (pronounced Anondomôţh in Bengali) in 1882, which is set in the events of the Sannyasi Rebellion. Jadunath Bhattacharya was asked to set a tune for this poem just after it was written.

Indian independence movement

"Vande Mataram was one of the most popular songs of protest during the Indian independence movement. The colonial government in response banned the book and made the recital of the song in public a crime. The colonial government imprisoned many independence activists for disobeying the order, but workers and general public repeatedly violated the ban many times by gathering together in the presence of colonial officials and singing it. Rabindranath Tagore sang Vande Mataram in 1896 at the Calcutta Congress Session held at Beadon Square. Dakhina Charan Sen sang it five years later in 1901 at another session of the Congress at Calcutta. Poet Sarala Devi Chaudurani sang the song in the Benares Congress Session in 1905. Lala Lajpat Rai started a journal called Vande Mataram from Lahore. Hiralal Sen made India's first political film in 1905 which ended with the chant. Matangini Hazra's last words as she was shot to death by the Crown police were Vande Mataram.

In 1907, Bhikaiji Cama (1861–1936) created the first version of India's national flag (the Tiranga) in Stuttgart, Germany, in 1907. It had Vande Mataram written on it in the middle band.

A book titled Kranti Geetanjali published by Arya Printing Press (Lahore) and Bharatiya Press (Dehradun) in 1929 contains first two stanzas of this lyric on page 11 as Matra Vandana and a ghazal (Vande Mataram) composed by Bismil was also given on its back, i.e. page 12. The book written by the famous martyr of Kakori Pandit Ram Prasad Bismil was proscribed by the colonial government.

Mahatama Gandhi supported adoption and the singing of the Vande Mataram song. In January 1946, in a speech in Guwahati (Assam), he urged that "Jai Hind should not replace Vande-mataram". He reminded everyone present that Vande-mataram was being sung since the inception of the Congress. He supported the "Jai Hind" greeting, but remanded that this greeting should not be to the exclusion of Vande Mataram. Gandhi was concerned that those who discarded Vande Mataram given the tradition of sacrifice behind it, one day would discard "Jai Hind" also.

Debate on adoption as national song of India

Parts of the Vande Mataram was chosen as the national song in 1937 by the Indian National Congress as it pursued the independence of India from colonial rule, after a committee consisting of Maulana Azad, Jawaharlal Nehru, Subhash Bose, Acharya Deva and Rabrindanath Tagore recommended the adoption. The entire song was not selected by Hindu leaders in order to respect the sentiments of non-Hindus, and the gathering agreed that anyone should be free to sing an alternate "unobjectionable song" at a national gathering if they do not want to sing Vande Mataram because they find it "objectionable" for a personal reason. According to the gathered leaders, including the Nobel Laureate Rabindranath Tagore, though the first two stanzas began with an unexceptionable evocation of the beauty of the motherland, in later stanzas there are references to the Hindu goddess Durga. The Muslim League and Muhammad Ali Jinnah opposed the song. Thereafter, with the support of Mahatma Gandhi and Jawahar Lal Nehru, the Indian National Congress decided to adopt only the first two stanzas as the national song to be sung at public gatherings, and other verses that included references to Durga and Lakshmi were expunged.

Rajendra Prasad, who was presiding the Constituent Assembly on 24 January 1950, made the following statement which was also adopted as the final decision on the issue:

...The composition consisting of the words and music known as Jana Gana Mana is the National Anthem of India, subject to such alterations in the words as the Government may authorise as occasion arises; and the song Vande Mataram, which has played a historic part in the struggle for Indian freedom, shall be honoured equally with Jana Gana Mana and shall have equal status with it. (Applause). I hope this will satisfy the Members.
—Constituent Assembly of India, Vol. XII, 24-1-1950

Performances and interpretations
The poem has been set to a large number of tunes. The oldest surviving audio recordings date to 1907, and there have been more than a hundred different versions recorded throughout the 20th century. Many of these versions have employed traditional Indian classical ragas. Versions of the song have been visualised on celluloid in a number of films, including Leader, Amar Asha, and Anand Math. It is widely believed that the tune set for All India Radio station version was composed by Ravi Shankar. Hemant Kumar composed music for the song in the movie Anand Math in 1952. Many singers like Lata Mangeshkar, K.S.Chithra sung made it cult classic. In 2002, BBC World Service conducted an international poll to choose ten most famous songs of all time. Around 7000 songs were selected from all over the world. Vande Mataram, from the movie Anand Math, was ranked second. All India Radio's version and some other versions are in Desh raga.

In July 2017, the Madras High Court ruled that the Vande Mataram shall be sung or played at least once a week in all schools, universities and other educational institutions of Tamil Nadu. The Court also ruled that the song should be played or sung in government offices and industrial facilities at least once a month.

See also

 Anandmath— The novel from which "Vande Mataram" gained popularity
 "Jana Gana Mana"- The Indian national anthem
 "Subh Sukh Chain"
 Banga Mata
 Bharat Mata
 Jaya Bharata Jananiya Tanujate
 Tamil Thai
 Telugu Thalli
 Telangana Thalli
 Bharat Mata Ki Jai
 Vande Mataram (album)
 National Pledge
 List of Indian state anthems

Notes

References

 Sabyasachi Bhattacharya, Vande Mataram: The Biography of a Song, Penguin Books, 2003, .

Further reading 
  Bande (with a B rather than a V) Mataram plays a great part in this novel about a Bengali family.
 "Vande Mataram : Biography of a Song" by Sabyasachi Bhattacharya, Publisher:Penguin,

External links

Vocals
 Vande Mataram, Lata Mangeshkar in Anand Math (4:57 minutes)
 Vande Mataram, Amruta Suresh and Abhirami Suresh (4:36 minutes)
 Vande Mataram, Group song (1:09 minutes)
Debate
 "National Song" section, Official Portal of the Indian Government
 How Secular is Vande Mataram?, AG Noorani, Frontline
 Boycott threat over Indian song, BBC
 1937 Congress Resolution on validity of Muslim objection to this song, Outlook India

Indian literature
Indian patriotic songs
National symbols of India
Sanskrit texts
Bengali-language songs
Indian political slogans